Zomus is a monotypic genus of hubbardiid short-tailed whipscorpions, first described by Reddell & Cokendolpher in 1995. Its single species, Zomus bagnallii is distributed in: Cook Islands, Fiji, Germany, Indonesia (Krakatau Islands), Malaysia, Mauritius (Rodrigues), Samoa, Seychelles, Singapore and Introduced into the UK.

References 

Schizomida genera
Monotypic arachnid genera